Fandas Shakirovich Safiullin (17 August 1936 – 10 October 2021) was a Russian politician. A member of the Fatherland – All Russia party, he served in the Third State Duma from 1999 to 2003.  As an ethnic Tatar, Safiullin fought for the rights of his people; for example, the right to use the Latin alphabet instead of the Cyrillic one.

Safiullin died from COVID-19 in October 2021.  The death of Safiullin was, according to poet Razil Valeev, "a great loss to the people and the nation".

References

External links 
 Russia: Tatars try to save their language

1936 births
2021 deaths
Russian politicians
Third convocation members of the State Duma (Russian Federation)
Politicians of Tatarstan
People from Aznakayevsky District
Deaths from the COVID-19 pandemic in Russia

Tatar people
Tatar politicians
Tatar people of Russia
Volga Tatars